Manfredonia is a town in Italy and an Italian language name.  It may also refer to:

Places 

 Gulf of Manfredonia
 Manfredonia Cathedral
 Manfredonia Lighthouse

People 

 Francesco Capuano Di Manfredonia, 15th century Italian astronomer
 Giulio Manfredonia (b. 1967), Italian film director and screenwriter
 Lionello Manfredonia (b. 1956), Italian footballer
 Valentino Manfredonia (b. 1989), Italian boxer

Organizations 

 Manfredonia Calcio, an association football club in Italy